Kakim is a village in the Méguet Department of Ganzourgou Province in central Burkina Faso. As of 2005, the village has a population of 333.

References

Populated places in the Plateau-Central Region
Ganzourgou Province